Begoña Aránzazu Larzábal Fernández (born January 19, 1971 in Madrid) is a former field hockey midfielder from Spain, who represented her native country at two consecutive Olympic Games: in 1996 and 2000. At her last try she finished fourth with the Spanish national team, after a 2-0 loss in the bronze medal game against the Netherlands.

References

External links
 

1971 births
Sportspeople from San Sebastián
Field hockey players at the 1996 Summer Olympics
Field hockey players at the 2000 Summer Olympics
Living people
Olympic field hockey players of Spain
Spanish female field hockey players
Field hockey players from Madrid